Carbon-14, C-14,  or radiocarbon, is a radioactive isotope of carbon with an atomic nucleus containing 6 protons and 8 neutrons. Its presence in organic materials is the basis of the radiocarbon dating method pioneered by Willard Libby and colleagues (1949) to date archaeological, geological and hydrogeological samples. Carbon-14 was discovered on February 27, 1940, by Martin Kamen and Sam Ruben at the University of California Radiation Laboratory in Berkeley, California. Its existence had been suggested by Franz Kurie in 1934.

There are three naturally occurring isotopes of carbon on Earth: carbon-12, which makes up 99% of all carbon on Earth; carbon-13, which makes up 1%; and carbon-14, which occurs in trace amounts, making up about 1 or 1.5 atoms per 1012 atoms of carbon in the atmosphere. Carbon-12 and carbon-13 are both stable, while carbon-14 is unstable and has a half-life of  years. Carbon-14 has a maximum specific activity of 62.5 mCi/mmol (2.31 GBq/mmol), or 164.9 GBq/g. Carbon-14 decays into nitrogen-14 through beta decay. A gram of carbon containing 1 atom of carbon-14 per 1012 atoms will emit ~0.2 beta particles per second. The primary natural source of carbon-14 on Earth is cosmic ray action on nitrogen in the atmosphere, and it is therefore a cosmogenic nuclide. However, open-air nuclear testing between 1955 and 1980 contributed to this pool.

The different isotopes of carbon do not differ appreciably in their chemical properties. This resemblance is used in chemical and biological research, in a technique called carbon labeling: carbon-14 atoms can be used to replace nonradioactive carbon, in order to trace chemical and biochemical reactions involving carbon atoms from any given organic compound.

Radioactive decay and detection
Carbon-14 goes through radioactive beta decay:

 →  +  +  + 156.5 keV

By emitting an electron and an electron antineutrino, one of the neutrons in the carbon-14 atom decays to a proton and the carbon-14 (half-life of 5,730 ± 40 years) decays into the stable (non-radioactive) isotope nitrogen-14.

As usual with beta decay, almost all the decay energy is carried away by the beta particle and the neutrino. The emitted beta particles have a maximum energy of about 156 keV, while their weighted mean energy is 49 keV. These are relatively low energies; the maximum distance traveled is estimated to be 22 cm in air and 0.27 mm in body tissue. The fraction of the radiation transmitted through the dead skin layer is estimated to be 0.11. Small amounts of carbon-14 are not easily detected by typical Geiger–Müller (G-M) detectors; it is estimated that G-M detectors will not normally detect contamination of less than about 100,000 disintegrations per minute (0.05 µCi). Liquid scintillation counting is the preferred method although more recently, accelerator mass spectrometry has become the method of choice; it counts all the carbon-14 atoms in the sample and not just the few that happen to decay during the measurements; it can therefore be used with much smaller samples (as small as individual plant seeds), and gives results much more quickly. The G-M counting efficiency is estimated to be 3%. The half-distance layer in water is 0.05 mm.

Radiocarbon dating

Radiocarbon dating is a radiometric dating method that uses to determine the age of carbonaceous materials up to about 60,000 years old. The technique was developed by Willard Libby and his colleagues in 1949 during his tenure as a professor at the University of Chicago. Libby estimated that the radioactivity of exchangeable carbon-14 would be about 14 disintegrations per minute (dpm) per gram of pure carbon, and this is still used as the activity of the modern radiocarbon standard. In 1960, Libby was awarded the Nobel Prize in chemistry for this work.

One of the frequent uses of the technique is to date organic remains from archaeological sites. However, it decreases thereafter from radioactive decay, allowing the date of death or fixation to be estimated. The initial  level for the calculation can either be estimated, or else directly compared with known year-by-year data from tree-ring data (dendrochronology) up to 10,000 years ago (using overlapping data from live and dead trees in a given area), or else from cave deposits (speleothems), back to about 45,000 years before the present. A calculation or (more accurately) a direct comparison of carbon-14 levels in a sample, with tree ring or cave-deposit carbon-14 levels of a known age, then gives the wood or animal sample age-since-formation. Radiocarbon is also used to detect disturbance in natural ecosystems; for example, in peatland landscapes, radiocarbon can indicate that carbon which was previously stored in organic soils is being released due to land clearance or climate change.

Cosmogenic nuclides are also used as proxy data to characterize cosmic particle and solar activity of the distant past.

Origin

Natural production in the atmosphere

Carbon-14 is produced in the upper troposphere and the stratosphere by thermal neutrons absorbed by nitrogen atoms. When cosmic rays enter the atmosphere, they undergo various transformations, including the production of neutrons. The resulting neutrons (n) participate in the following n-p reaction (p is proton):

 + n →  + p

Production rates vary because of changes to the cosmic ray flux caused by the heliospheric modulation (solar wind and solar magnetic field), and, of great significance, due to variations in the Earth's magnetic field. Changes in the carbon cycle however can make such effects difficult to isolate and quantify.

Occasional spikes may occur; for example, there is evidence for an unusually high production rate in AD 774–775, caused by an extreme
solar energetic particle event, strongest for the last ten millennia. Another "extraordinarily large"  increase (2%) has been associated with a 5480 BC event, which is unlikely to be a solar energetic particle event.

Carbon-14 may also be produced by lightning  but in amounts negligible, globally, compared to cosmic ray production. Local effects of cloud-ground discharge through sample residues are unclear, but possibly significant.

Other carbon-14 sources
Carbon-14 can also be produced by other neutron reactions, including in particular (n,γ) and (n,α) with thermal neutrons, and (n,d) and (n,) with fast neutrons. The most notable routes for  production by thermal neutron irradiation of targets (e.g., in a nuclear reactor) are summarized in the table.

However, this origin is extremely rare.

Formation during nuclear tests

The above-ground nuclear tests that occurred in several countries between 1955 and 1980 (see nuclear test list) dramatically increased the amount of carbon-14 in the atmosphere and subsequently in the biosphere; after the tests ended, the atmospheric concentration of the isotope began to decrease, as radioactive  was fixed into plant and animal tissue, and dissolved in the oceans.

One side-effect of the change in atmospheric carbon-14 is that this has enabled some options (e.g., bomb-pulse dating) for determining the birth year of an individual, in particular, the amount of carbon-14 in tooth enamel, or the carbon-14 concentration in the lens of the eye.

In 2019, Scientific American reported that carbon-14 from nuclear bomb testing has been found in the bodies of aquatic animals found in one of the most inaccessible regions of the earth, the Mariana Trench in the Pacific Ocean.

Emissions from nuclear power plants 
Carbon-14 is produced in coolant at boiling water reactors (BWRs) and pressurized water reactors (PWRs). It is typically released to the atmosphere in the form of carbon dioxide at BWRs, and methane at PWRs. Best practice for nuclear power plant operator management of carbon-14 includes releasing it at night, when plants are not photosynthesizing. Carbon-14 is also generated inside nuclear fuels (some due to transmutation of oxygen in the uranium oxide, but most significantly from transmutation of nitrogen-14 impurities), and if the spent fuel is sent to nuclear reprocessing then the carbon-14 is released, for example as  during PUREX.

Occurrence

Dispersion in the environment 
After production in the upper atmosphere, the carbon-14 atoms react rapidly to form mostly (about 93%)  (carbon monoxide), which subsequently oxidizes at a slower rate to form , radioactive carbon dioxide. The gas mixes rapidly and becomes evenly distributed throughout the atmosphere (the mixing timescale in the order of weeks). Carbon dioxide also dissolves in water and thus permeates the oceans, but at a slower rate. The atmospheric half-life for removal of  has been estimated to be roughly 12 to 16 years in the northern hemisphere. The transfer between the ocean shallow layer and the large reservoir of bicarbonates in the ocean depths occurs at a limited rate.

Total inventory
The inventory of carbon-14 in Earth's biosphere is about 300 megacuries (11 EBq), of which most is in the oceans.
The following inventory of carbon-14 has been given:
 Global inventory: ~8500 PBq (about 50 t)
 Atmosphere: 140 PBq (840 kg)
 Terrestrial materials: the balance
 From nuclear testing (until 1990): 220 PBq (1.3 t)

In fossil fuels

Dating a specific sample of fossilized carbonaceous material is more complicated. Such deposits often contain trace amounts of carbon-14. These amounts can vary significantly between samples, ranging up to 1% of the ratio found in living organisms, a concentration comparable to an apparent age of 40,000 years. This may indicate possible contamination by small amounts of bacteria, underground sources of radiation causing the (n,p) reaction, direct uranium decay (although reported measured ratios of /U in uranium-bearing ores would imply roughly 1 uranium atom for every two carbon atoms in order to cause the / ratio, measured to be on the order of 10−15), or other unknown secondary sources of carbon-14 production. The presence of carbon-14 in the isotopic signature of a sample of carbonaceous material possibly indicates its contamination by biogenic sources or the decay of radioactive material in surrounding geologic strata. In connection with building the Borexino solar neutrino observatory, petroleum feedstock (for synthesizing the primary scintillant) was obtained with low  content.

In the human body
Since many sources of human food are ultimately derived from terrestrial plants, the relative concentration of carbon-14 in our bodies is nearly identical to the relative concentration in the atmosphere. The rates of disintegration of potassium-40 and carbon-14 in the normal adult body are comparable (a few thousand disintegrated nuclei per second). The beta-decays from external (environmental) radiocarbon contribute approximately 0.01 mSv/year (1 mrem/year) to each person's dose of ionizing radiation. This is small compared to the doses from potassium-40 (0.39 mSv/year) and radon (variable).

Carbon-14 can be used as a radioactive tracer in medicine. In the initial variant of the urea breath test, a diagnostic test for Helicobacter pylori, urea labeled with approximately  carbon-14 is fed to a patient (i.e., 37,000 decays per second). In the event of a H. pylori infection, the bacterial urease enzyme breaks down the urea into ammonia and radioactively-labeled carbon dioxide, which can be detected by low-level counting of the patient's breath.

See also
 Carbon-to-nitrogen ratio
 Diamond battery
 Isotopes of carbon
 Isotopic labeling
 Radiocarbon dating

References

Further reading

External links
 What is Carbon Dating?, Woods Hole Oceanographic Institute

Isotopes of carbon
Environmental isotopes
Radionuclides used in radiometric dating